The 1957 USA Outdoor Track and Field Championships men's competition took place between June 20-22 at Welcome Stadium in Dayton, Ohio.  The high jump apron at Welcome Stadium was made of asphalt to the surprise of Olympic Champion Charles Dumas who brought long spikes.  After a visit to a local shoe store, Dumas went on to win at 6'10¼"

Results

Men track events

Men field events

Women track events

Women field events

See also
United States Olympic Trials (track and field)

References

 Results from T&FN
 results

USA Outdoor Track and Field Championships
Usa Outdoor Track And Field Championships, 1957
Track and field in Ohio
1957 in sports in Ohio
Sports competitions in Dayton, Ohio